Pacoima Dam is a concrete arch dam on Pacoima Creek in the San Gabriel Mountains, in Los Angeles County, California. The reservoir it creates, Pacoima Reservoir, has a capacity of 

Built by the Los Angeles County Flood Control District, which became part of the Department of Public Works, it was completed in 1928. At the time, the 371 foot (113m) high dam was the tallest arch dam in the U.S.

As a flood control structure, district routinely compensates for hydraulic deficiencies in downstream areas by restraining flows of stormwater released from the dam.

Instrumentation
As construction of Pacoima Dam began, the County of Los Angeles hired Roy W. Carlson as their concrete and soil testing engineer. He developed the world's first strain meter which could be embedded in concrete. He also developed an adiabatic calorimeter and electrical-resistance thermometers to find why the temperature of concrete increased during curing and how best to avoid cracking caused by these stresses.

Earthquake monitoring
The Pacoima Dam withstood, but was damaged by the very strong (>1 g) ground movement which occurred during both the 1971 San Fernando and 1994 Northridge earthquakes. Because of concerns about the stability of the dam and especially its response to potential future earthquakes, the County of Los Angeles, with the technical support of the USGS, began monitoring the dam using continuous GPS.

See also
 Angeles National Forest
 List of dams and reservoirs in California
 List of lakes in California

References

External links 

 Image of workers at the bottom of a canyon at the Pacoima Dam site working on wood framing and concrete pouring, 1926. Los Angeles Times Photographic Archive (Collection 1429). UCLA Library Special Collections, Charles E. Young Research Library, University of California, Los Angeles.

Los Angeles County Department of Public Works dams
Arch dams
San Gabriel Mountains
San Fernando Valley
Dams completed in 1929